Mainline Corporation Ltd ("Mainline") was one of Australia's largest construction companies during the late 1960s and early 1970s. Mainline Corporation was responsible for building some of Australia's most notable landmark buildings before its collapse in 1974.

History
Mainline Corporation was established in 1961 by Mr Richard ("Dick") C Baker as a small construction company in Sydney building apartment blocks in Double Bay and Potts Point. By 1965 it had expanded into commercial developments including the AMP Building and Gold Fields House. In 1967, Langer Avery was appointed as Chief Financial Officer of Mainline Corporation Ltd. 

In December 1968, Mainline Corporation Ltd was listed on the Sydney Stock Exchange.
Major shareholders were AMP Limited, L.C. O'Neil Enterprises Pty Ltd (Laurie O'Neil) and W.R. Carpenter Holdings Ltd (Walter Randolph Carpenter).

In June 1971, Mainline Corporation paid $1.35 million for a site in Canberra CBD.

In August 1971, Mainline Corporation declared a consolidated net profit of $844,203 for FY71 on the back of a revenue of $41.5 million for FY71.

In August 1972, Mainline Corporation declared a consolidated net profit of $1,722,258 for FY72 on the back of a revenue of $56 million for FY72. The value of the reported building contracts in hand at 30 June 1972 was $123 million.

In 1972, Mainline Corporation acquired Dunkerley Hat Mills maker of the Aussie Icon Akubra Hats.

In 1972, Dillingham Construction handed over Australian and South-East Asian contracts including Western Distributor (Sydney) and projects underway including the Melbourne Hilton Hotel to Mainline Corporation to manage.

In 1973, Michael Warson sells 51% of Glenvill to Mainline. Name changes to Glenvill Mainline Homes and opens branches in QLD & South Australia. At the time, the company was the second largest home builder in Australia.

In September 1973, Mainline Corporation performed a 1:5 premium share issue to raise $3,649,265.

In April 1974, many property developers were paying finance companies 15% for money. By May 1974, developers were paying finance companies 19% to 20% for call money. As the liquidity in the market tightened, land prices in Sydney fell 14%, including a 15% drop in Sydney's north shore house prices.

On 3 August 1974, Mainline Corporation reported a profit.

On 15 August 1974, Mainline Corporation's shares plunged by 40% on the back of rumors of a liquidity crisis. This resulted in a stock exchange inquiry.

On 20 August 1974 Mainline Corporation's principal creditor, the ANZ Bank, asked for a receiver to be appointed and Mainline was placed in voluntary administration and liquidated.

Mainline corporation Ltd appointed Mr J. H. Jamison as the receiver-manager to administer the more than $60 million owed to creditors.

Following the collapse of Mainline Corporation in August 1974, the Builders Labourers Federation (BLF) called for nationalisation of the building industry under workers control.

On the 16 April 1975, sixteen of Mainline Corporation's best properties (estimated at $86.8 million value) across Australia were sold by Sydney auctioneer F. R. Strange under the instruction of the receiver Mr J. H. Jamison to raise fund to pay creditors.

Major construction projects
Mainline has built some of Australasia's landmark buildings, including the following major projects:

Mainline Investments Pty Ltd 

Mainline Investments Pty Ltd, was a wholly owned subsidiary of Mainline Corporation. Mainline Investments owned the following assests:

Mainzeal 
In 1968, Mainline Corporation Ltd established a branch in New Zealand to develop 7 acres (28,000 m2) of harbour-front land in downtown Auckland, New Zealand.

In 1973, Mainline Corporation Ltd incorporated the company Mainline Corporation of New Zealand, a publicly listed New Zealand company. Mainline Corporation Ltd retained 49% shareholding in Mainline Corporation of New Zealand and the new company acquired all of Mainline's interests in New Zealand.

In 1975, Mainline Corporation of New Zealand adopted the name Mainzeal Corporation Ltd ("Mainzeal").

References

Companies based in Sydney
Companies formerly listed on the Australian Securities Exchange
Construction and civil engineering companies established in 1961
Construction and civil engineering companies of Australia
Australian companies established in 1961
Australian companies disestablished in 1974
Construction and civil engineering companies disestablished in the 20th century